Shahkush ( is a mountain in Baghlan in Afghanistan. It is located near the settlement Shah Kush. It is at the coordinates (35° 37' 20.4" N 69° 6' 44.8" E).

Mountains of the Hindu Kush
One-thousanders of Afghanistan
Landforms of Baghlan Province